Hon. Anne Theresa Bickerton Lyons was born in 1815 to Edmund Lyons (later 1st Baron Lyons, of Christchurch, Hampshire) and Augusta Louisa (née Rogers). In Athens, Greece on 24 December 1839, she married Philipp Hartmann Veit von Würtzburg (1811 – 1897), Baron von Würtzburg. Anne died on 11 June 1894 in Bamberg, Bavaria, where she was buried in the village graveyard in Mitwitz.

Issue

See also
Lyons family

Sources
 
 

1815 births
1894 deaths
Daughters of barons